The Bishop of Kells was the ordinary of the Pre-Reformation Irish Catholic episcopal see based at Kells, County Meath, Ireland.

It was founded by Saint Columba. Known incumbents include Moel Finian and Tuathal Ua Connachtaig.

References

Religion in County Meath
Kells
Bishops of Kells
Former Roman Catholic bishoprics in Ireland